Robby Ginepri was the defending champion, but did not participate.

Facundo Argüello won the title, defeating Frances Tiafoe in the final, 2–6, 7–6(7–5), 6–4.

Seeds

Draw

Finals

Top half

Bottom half

References
 Main Draw
 Qualifying Draw

2015 ATP Challenger Tour
2015 Singles